The 209th Battalion, CEF, was a unit in the Canadian Expeditionary Force during the First World War. Based in Swift Current, Saskatchewan, the unit began recruiting in early 1916 in that city and surrounding district.  After sailing to England in November 1916, the battalion was absorbed into the 9th Reserve Battalion on January 4, 1917. The 209th Battalion, CEF, had one officer commanding: Lieutenant-Colonel W.O. Smyth. The battalion was disbanded on  May 21, 1917.

On January 15, 1930, the perpetuation of the 209th Battalion was assigned to the 1st Regiment (209th Battalion, CEF), 14th Canadian Light Horse. The 14th Canadian Light Horse, now named 14th Canadian Hussars, was placed on the Supplementary Order of Battle in 1968.

References
Meek, John F. Over the Top! The Canadian Infantry in the First World War. Orangeville, Ont.: The Author, 1971.

Battalions of the Canadian Expeditionary Force
Swift Current
14th Canadian Hussars